Jean-Marc Souverbie (born 9 April 1975 in Pau, France) is a French rugby union footballer, currently playing for US Morlaàs  in the Fédérale 1. His usual position is at a Fullback. Prior to joining US Morlaàs he played for Section Paloise, Bègles and USA Perpignan. He made his debut for France on 28 May 2000 against Romania.

Honours 
 Finalist of Heineken Cup with USA Perpignan in 2003
 Finalist of European Challenge Cup, 2005 with Section Paloise against Sale Sharks

External links
Jean-Marc Souverbie at ESPNscrum

1975 births
Living people
French rugby union players
France international rugby union players
Sportspeople from Pau, Pyrénées-Atlantiques
USA Perpignan players
Section Paloise players
CA Bordeaux-Bègles Gironde players
Rugby union fullbacks